Wesley Martin (born May 9, 1996) is an American football offensive guard for the Washington Commanders of the National Football League (NFL). He played college football at Indiana and was drafted by Washington in the fourth round of the 2019 NFL Draft. Martin has also been a member of the New York Giants and Jacksonville Jaguars.

Early life and high school
Martin grew up in West Milton, Ohio, and attended Milton-Union High School. He was named the Southwestern Buckeye League Offensive Lineman of the Year as a junior and first team All-Ohio as a senior. A 3-star recruit, Martin committed to Indiana over offers from Ball State, Bowling Green, Kent State, Miami (OH), and Ohio.

College career
Martin spent five years with the Indiana Hoosiers, redshirting his true freshman season. He played in 50 total games for the Hoosiers, 43 of which were starts, and was named honorable mention All-Big Ten in his redshirt junior and senior seasons.

Professional career

Washington Redskins / Football Team
Martin was drafted by the Washington Redskins in the fourth round (131st overall) of the 2019 NFL Draft. Martin made his NFL debut on September 29, 2019, starting at right guard in place of starter Brandon Scherff in a 24-3 loss to the New York Giants. Martin started the final three games on the season after Scherff was placed on season-ending injured reserved and finished his rookie season with nine games played and five starts.

At the start of the 2020 season, Martin was named the starting left guard replacing Ereck Flowers, who left the team via free agency. He started the first five games of the season before Saahdiq Charles was named the starting left guard over him going into Washington's week six game against the Giants and Wes Schweitzer was chosen to replace Charles when he suffered a knee injury. He was released on August 31, 2021, but re-signed to the practice squad the following day.

New York Giants
Martin signed with the New York Giants on September 27, 2021. On December 6, 2021, Martin was placed on reserve/COVID-19 list and was reactivated on December 16, 2021. He was waived on May 10, 2022.

Jacksonville Jaguars
On May 11, 2022, Martin was claimed by the Jacksonville Jaguars. He was waived on August 23, 2022.

Washington Commanders
Martin was claimed off waivers by the Washington Commanders on August 24, 2022. He was released on August 30 before re-signing to their practice squad on September 5, 2022. Martin was promoted to the active roster on December 22, 2022.

References

External links

Washington Commanders bio
Indiana Hoosiers bio

1996 births
Living people
People from West Milton, Ohio
Players of American football from Ohio
American football offensive guards
Indiana Hoosiers football players
Washington Redskins players
Washington Football Team players
Washington Commanders players
New York Giants players
Jacksonville Jaguars players